The Bandai Super Vision 8000, also known as the TV Jack 8000, is a home video game console released by Bandai in 1979 belonging to the second generation. The console can be directly connected to a TV.

This console was the last of the Bandai TV Jack console series but was completely different from the other consoles of the series. The Super Vision 8000 had a central CPU. The other consoles belonged to the first generation: they didn't feature a microprocessor, and were based on custom codeless state machine computers consisting of discrete logic circuits comprising each element of the game itself (Pong-style console).

Technical specifications
CPU: 8-bit NEC D780C-1  (Z80 clone), running at 3.58 MHz
Resolution: 256 pixel x 192 with 2 Colors
 VDG: Ami S68047 (Motorola MC6847 clone)
Audio: General Instrument AY-3-8910, three channel sound, with one noise generator
Introductory price: 59,800 Yen (Japan)

Games
All seven games released for the console have been developed by Bandai Electronics and sold since 1979.

List of games
Missile Vader
Space Fire
Othello
Gun Professional
PacPacBird
Submarine
Beam Galaxian

References

External links
The Video Game Console Library. You can view some images of the console
Box shot
Super Vision 8000 games playable for free in the browser at the Internet Archive Console Living Room

Home video game consoles
Second-generation video game consoles
Bandai consoles
Products introduced in 1979